Lotfi Kadri is a Tunisian football manager.

References

Year of birth missing (living people)
Living people
Tunisian football managers
LPS Tozeur managers
EGS Gafsa managers
Stade Gabèsien managers
US Monastir (football) managers
Damac FC managers
EO Sidi Bouzid managers
Saudi First Division League managers
Tunisian expatriate football managers
Expatriate football managers in Saudi Arabia
Tunisian expatriate sportspeople in Saudi Arabia